Anxious to Return (also known as  Eagerly Homebound) is a 1981 Chinese film directed by Jun Li and starring Siqin Gaowa, Chen Peisi, and Erkang Zhao. The movie is best known for the first appearance of actress Siqin Gaowa.

Plot
The film is set in the 1930s, during the Sino-Japanese War, and tells about a widow and peasant woman, Yu Zhen, who finds and saves a wounded soldier, and falls in love with him. The soldier is "trying to grapple with his conflicting emotions." 

Siqin Gaowa won the Ministry of Culture's Youth Creativity Award in 1979 for her portrayal in this movie.

Cast
 Siqin Gaowa as Yuzhen
 Erkang Zhao as Wei Desheng
 Ma Zhigang as Uncle Qi
 Lu Yong as Dong Laoli
 Xu Yao as Chuan Zhu
 Han Zaisheng as Sun Haishan
 Zhao Baojun as a Veteran
 Li Fengqiu as Xiao Xuzi
 Chen Peisi as Police captain
 Zhao Shoukai
 Liu Zhao

References

External links
 

1981 films
1980s Mandarin-language films
1981 drama films
Chinese drama films